Free Country is an American sitcom that aired on ABC in the summer of 1978. The show starred Rob Reiner as Joseph Bresner, the head of a Lithuanian family that emigrated to New York City in the early-1900s. Each episode featured the 89-year-old Bresner in present-day (i.e. in the 1970s) reminiscing about events in the early-1900s. The bulk of the show would then consist of actually showing those events. The series lasted five episodes.

Cast
Rob Reiner . . . Joseph Bresner
Judith Kahan . . . Anna Bresner
Fred McCarren . . . Sidney Gewertzman
Renée Lippin . . . Ida Gewertzman
Larry Gelman . . . Leo Gold
Joe Pantoliano . . . Louis Peschi

Episode list

External links

Period television series
1970s American sitcoms
1978 American television series debuts
1978 American television series endings
Television shows set in New York City
American Broadcasting Company original programming
Television series by Sony Pictures Television